Urwego Bank (Urwego) is a Christ-centered Microfinance bank in Rwanda. It is licensed by the National Bank of Rwanda, the national banking regulator.

History
Founded in 1997 by World Relief as Urwego Community Banking, the bank joined the HOPE International network in 2005. In 2007, the bank merged with Opportunity International Bank of Rwanda to become Urwego Opportunity Bank.

With the approval of the National Bank of Rwanda, Opportunity International sold its 50% ownership of Urwego to HOPE International in 2017, making HOPE a 99% shareholder in the bank, with World Relief continuing to own 1%.

Overview
Urwego Bank is a licensed, Christian faith-based microfinance bank. Drawing upon its name (Urwego is the Kinyarwanda word that translates as “ladder” in English), Urwego's mission statement is, “To provide a ladder of opportunity to underserved communities in Rwanda as we proclaim and live the Gospel of Jesus Christ.”

Urwego seeks to reach Rwandans who are economically active but underserved by licensed banking institutions. It offers a full range of financial services, including loans and savings programs, as well as training to maximize the impact of financial products and empower clients for success in business, household management, and health.

Throughout its history, Urwego Bank has distributed nearly $290 million in loans.

Ownership
According to the bank's website, the following corporate entities are shareholders.

Branch network
, Urwego Bank had 15 full-service branches, seven of which, including the bank's headquarters, are located in the city of Kigali, Rwanda's capital. In addition, Urwego had 15 ATM locations across the country.

See also
 List of banks in Rwanda
 Economy of Rwanda

References

External links
 Urwego Bank website

Banks of Rwanda
Banks established in 1997
1997 establishments in Rwanda
Organisations based in Kigali
Economy of Kigali